Clapper Lake is a small lake located south-southwest of the hamlet of South Worcester in Delaware County, New York. Clapper Lake drains northwest via an unnamed creek which flows into Charlotte Creek.

See also
 List of lakes in New York

References 

Lakes of New York (state)
Lakes of Delaware County, New York